Louis-Adrien Berbrugger (May 11, 1801July 2, 1869) was a French archeologist and philologist.

Berbrugger was born in Paris. He was an Arabist, with a Muslim wife, who set up the National Library in Algiers.

Honors and accomplishments 
He died in Algiers. His memorial lists his honors and accomplishments (in French):
Curator of the library and museum of Algiers.
President of the Algerian Historical Society.
Member of the general council of the province of Algiers.
Colonel of the Algerian militia.
Commander of the French Legion of Honor.
Commander of the Order of Nichan Iftikhar.
Knight of the Order of St. Gregory the Great.

Selected writings 
 Nouveau dictionnaire de poche français-espagnol et espagnol-français, (1829) – New French-Spanish and Spanish-French pocket dictionary.
 Exploration scientifique de l'Algérie pendant les années 1840, 1841, 1842, (1847) – Scientific exploration of Algeria from 1840 to 1842. 
 Les époques militaires de la Grande Kabilie, (1857) – The military eras of the Great Kabylia.
 Le Pégnon d'Alger, ou, Les origines du gouvernement Turc en Algérie, (1860) – The Peñón of Algiers, or, the origins of the Turkish government in Algeria 
 Le tombeau de la chrétienne, mausolée des rois mauritaniens de la dernière dynastie, (1867) – The Christian tomb at the Royal Mausoleum of Mauretania of the last dynasty.

Notes

1801 births
1869 deaths
Archaeologists from Paris
Commandeurs of the Légion d'honneur
École Nationale des Chartes alumni